Finlantic was a Finnish charter airline from 1961 to 1963.

History
The airline was formed to operate long-haul freight and passenger charters and first operated in November 1961 with a Douglas DC-6C. By 1963 it had two aircraft but was reported to have become bankrupt and ceased operations.

Fleet
Douglas DC-6B
Douglas DC-6C

Notes

1961 establishments in Finland
1963 disestablishments in Finland
Airlines established in 1961
Airlines disestablished in 1963
Defunct airlines of Finland
Finnish companies established in 1961